This is a list of the municipalities in the state of Tocantins (TO), located in the North Region of Brazil. Tocantins is divided into 139 municipalities, which are grouped into 8 microregions, which are grouped into 2 mesoregions.

See also
Geography of Brazil
List of cities in Brazil

Tocantins